A transatlantic telecommunications cable is a submarine communications cable connecting one side of the Atlantic Ocean to the other. In the 19th and early 20th centuries, each cable was a single wire. After mid-century, coaxial cable came into use, with amplifiers. Late in the 20th century, all cables installed used optical fiber as well as optical amplifiers, because distances range thousands of kilometers.

History
When the first transatlantic telegraph cable was laid in 1858 by Cyrus West Field, it operated for only three weeks; subsequent attempts in 1865 and 1866 were more successful. In July 1866 Great Eastern sailed out of Valentia Island, Ireland and on July 26th landed at Hearts Content in Newfoundland. It was active until 1965.  Although a telephone cable was discussed starting in the 1920s, to be practical it needed a number of technological advances which did not arrive until the 1940s. Starting in 1927, transatlantic telephone service was radio-based.

TAT-1 (Transatlantic No. 1) was the first transatlantic telephone cable system. It was laid between Gallanach Bay, near Oban, and Clarenville, Newfoundland between 1955 and 1956 by the cable ship Monarch. It was inaugurated on September 25, 1956, initially carrying 36 telephone channels. In the first 24 hours of public service, there were 588 London–U.S. calls and 119 from London to Canada. The capacity of the cable was soon increased to 48 channels. Later, an additional three channels were added by use of C Carrier equipment. Time-assignment speech interpolation (TASI) was implemented on the TAT-1 cable in June 1960 and effectively increased the cable's capacity from 37 (out of 51 available channels) to 72 speech circuits. TAT-1 was finally retired in 1978. Later coaxial cables, installed through the 1970s, used transistors and had higher bandwidth. The Moscow–Washington hotline was initially connected through this system.

Current technology
All cables presently in service use fiber optic technology. Many cables terminate in Newfoundland and Ireland, which lie on the great circle route from London, UK to New York City, US.

There has been a succession of newer transatlantic cable systems. All recent systems have used fiber optic transmission, and a self-healing ring topology.  Late in the 20th century, communications satellites lost most of their North Atlantic telephone traffic to these low-cost, high-capacity, low-latency cables.  This advantage only increases over time, as tighter cables provide higher bandwidth – the 2012 generation of cables drop the transatlantic latency to under 60 milliseconds, according to Hibernia Atlantic, deploying such a cable that year.

Some new cables are being announced on the South Atlantic: SACS (South Atlantic Cable System) and SAex (South Atlantic Express).

TAT cable routes
The TAT series of cables constitute a large percentage of all North Atlantic cables. All TAT cables are joint ventures between a number of telecommunications companies, e.g. British Telecom. CANTAT cables terminate in Canada rather than in the US.

Private cable routes
There are a number of private non-TAT cables.

South Atlantic cable routes

See also
Cable layer
List of international submarine communications cables

References

External links 

Aronsson's Telecom History Timeline
Timeline of Submarine Communications Cables, 1850–2016
Submarine Cable Landings Worldwide

History of the telephone
 
History of telecommunications in the United States
History of telecommunications in the United Kingdom